Patrice Killoffer, better known simply as Killoffer (born 16 June 1966), is a writer and artist of comics. He was co-founder of the independent comics publisher L'Association in 1990, and has been a part of Oubapo since its creation in 1992.

Career
Patrice Killoffer studied at the School for Applied Arts Duperré in Paris in the 1980s. His teachers included comics authors Georges Pichard and Yves Got, who influenced him in his early works. He created his first pages in 1981, during his studies.

In 1987, he made the first issue of the magazine Pas un seul with Jean-Yves Duhoo. In the following years, he published in the magazines Globof, Lynx, and Labo, which was published by Futuropolis. Since 1990, he publishes regularly in Lapin, the magazine of publisher L'Association, which later published three of his albums.

More recently, he has published in the magazine Psikopat and he produces illustrations for the newspapers Libération and Le Monde, and writes a column for La Vie. In 2000, he was one of three artists responsible for the carnaval at Saint-Denis. Since 2006, he is the illustrator of the books of Fantômette, a classic French series of youth literature. Killoffer also created four stamps for the Swiss Post in 2006, making him the first foreign artist to design Swiss stamps.

Some of his works have been translated into Dutch and German. 676 Apparitions of Killoffer is his first work to be translated in English.

Influences
Apart from his teachers, Killoffer cites as his influences the Dutch artists Willem and Joost Swarte. He also admires the work of Moebius. But despite these ligne claire influences, he is considered as the most experimental author of L'Association.

Awards
 2003: nominated for the Award for Best Comic Book at the Angoulême International Comics Festival, France
 2005: nominated for the Award for Best Artwork at the Angoulême International Comics Festival

Bibliography
 Killoffer en la matière, L'Association, 1992
 ?, Automne 67, 1994
 Billet SVP, L'Association, 1995
 La Clef des champs, L'Association, 1997
 La Bactérie, Les 4 mers, 1998
 Viva Pâtàmâch ! (art), with Jean-Louis Capron (text), Le Seuil, 2001
 Six cent soixante-seize apparitions de Killoffer (676 apparitions of Killoffer), L'Association, 2002, published in English in 2005 by Typocrat Press,<ref>English translation of 676 Apparitions announced in The Guardian, November 20, 2005</ref> published in Italien in 2017 by Coconino Press
 Donjon Monsters part 9 : Les Profondeurs (art), with Lewis Trondheim and Joann Sfar (text), Delcourt
 Le Rock et si je ne m'abuse le roll, L'Association, 2006
 Quand faut y aller, L'Association, 2006
 Léon l'étron, Thierry Magnier, 2007
 The Man Who Refused To Die'', with Nicolas Ancion, Dis Voir, 2010

Notes

French comics artists
French comics writers
French illustrators
1966 births
Living people
French male writers